KFOX (1650 kHz) is a Korean language AM radio station, licensed to Torrance, California and serving the Los Angeles metropolitan area. It shares a transmitter site with KWKW.

KFOX is one of three radio stations in the greater Los Angeles area broadcasting entirely in Korean, in addition to KMPC and KYPA.

History

KFOX began as the "expanded band" twin to a station on the standard AM band. On March 17, 1997, the Federal Communications Commission (FCC) announced that eighty-eight stations had been given permission to move to newly available "Expanded Band" transmitting frequencies, ranging from 1610 to 1700 kHz, with KNOB in Costa Mesa authorized to move from 540 kHz to 1650 kHz.

The FCC's initial policy was that both the original station and its expanded band counterpart could operate simultaneously for up to five years, after which owners would have to turn in one of the two licenses, depending on whether they preferred the new assignment or elected to remain on the original frequency. It was decided to eliminate the standard band station, and on August 15, 2000, the license for the original station on 540 kHz, now KKGO, was cancelled.

The new station on 1650 kHz was assigned the call letters KGXL on March 12, 1998, which was changed to KKTR on June 1, 1998, then back to KGXL on March 15, 1999. The station simulcast adult standards station KGIL, AM 1260 in Beverly Hills.

After several years, KGXL became "K-Traffic," providing constant news updates, and eight traffic updates each hour. On July 26, 2000, the call sign was changed to KFOX, a call sign previously used by two area stations dating back to 1928: 1280 AM (now KFRN) and 93.5 FM (now KDAY).

In 2001, KFOX switched from broadcasting in English to Korean, and adopted the slogan "Radio Seoul".

References

External links

Radio stations established in 1998
Korean-American culture in California
KFOX
FOX (AM)
Mass media in Torrance, California
FOX
1998 establishments in California